K. Ajith was a Member of the Legislative Assembly (MLA) of Vaikom Assembly Constituency and is representing Vaikom from 2006 to 2016 and he is from Communist Party of India.

Personal life 
He was born in Vaikom on 25 May 1971 to Shri. M.K. Kesavan and Smt. Thankamma. He is married to Smt. Sindhu and they have a daughter.

References

Members of the Kerala Legislative Assembly
1971 births
Communist Party of India politicians from Kerala
Living people
People from Vaikom